Christian Liberté Boltanski (6 September 1944 – 14 July 2021) was a French sculptor, photographer, painter, and film maker.  He is best known for his photography installations and contemporary French conceptual style.

Early life
Boltanski was born in Paris on 6 September 1944.  His father, Étienne Alexandre Boltanski, a physician, was Jewish and had come to France from Russia, while Marie-Elise Ilari-Guérin, his Roman Catholic mother originated from Corsica, descended from Ukrainian Jews. His Jewish heritage was a large influence in Boltanski's household. During World War II, while living in Paris, his father escaped deportation by hiding in a space under the floorboards of the family apartment for a year and a half. Christian grew up with this knowledge, and his early experiences with wartime affairs deeply affected him. These experiences would influence his artwork later on. He dropped out of school at age 12.

Early career
Boltanski began creating art in the late 1950s, but did not rise to prominence until almost a decade later through a few short, avant-garde films and some published notebooks in which he referenced his childhood. He had his first one-man exhibition at the Théâtre Le Ranelagh in May 1968.  His earliest works included imagery of ideal families and imaginary lifestyles (something Boltanski always lacked), made to display as if they were in museums.

Installation art

Boltanski began creating mixed media/materials installations in 1986 with light as essential concept. Tin boxes, altar-like construction of framed and manipulated  photographs (e.g. Le Lycée Chases, 1986–1987), photographs of Jewish schoolchildren taken in Vienna in 1931, used as a forceful reminder of mass murder of Jews by the Nazis, all those elements and materials used in his work are used in order to represent deep contemplation regarding reconstruction of past. While creating Reserve (exhibition at Museum für Gegenwartskunst in Basel in 1989), Boltanski filled rooms and corridors with worn clothing items as a way of inciting profound sensation of human tragedy at concentration camps. As in his previous works, objects serve as relentless reminders of human experience and suffering. His piece,  Monument (Odessa), uses six photographs of Jewish students in 1939 and lights to resemble Yahrzeit candles to honor and remember the dead. "My work is about the fact of dying, but it's not about the Holocaust itself." In 1971 Boltanski produced his installation, L' Album de la famille D. 1939-1964. 

Additionally, his enormous installation titled "No Man's Land" (2010) at the Park Avenue Armory in New York City, is a great example of how his constructions and installations trace the lives of the lost and forgotten.

Exhibitions
Boltanski participated in over 150 art exhibitions throughout the world. Among others, he had solo exhibitions at the New Museum (1988), the Kunstmuseum Liechtenstein, Magasin 3 in Stockholm, the La Maison Rouge gallery, Institut Mathildenhöhe, the Kewenig Galerie, The Musée d'Art et d'Histoire du Judaïsme, and many others.

In 2002, Boltanski made the installation Totentanz II, a shadow installation with copper figures, for the underground Centre for International Light Art (CILA) in Unna, Germany. Nine years later, the Es Baluard museum in Mallorca exhibited Signatures from July to September 2011. The installation was conceived by Boltanski specifically for Es Baluard and which is focused on the memory of the workers who in the 17th century built the museum's walls.

In the winter of 2017–2018, Boltanski created a new installation for the Oude Kerk, titled After.  It tackled the theme of what will come after life has come to an end. The exhibition was shown from November 2017 until April 2018.

Personal life
Boltanski was married to Annette Messager, who is also a contemporary artist, until his death. They chose not to have children. They lived in Malakoff, outside Paris. He was the brother of sociologist Luc Boltanski and uncle of writer Christophe Boltanski.

Boltanski died on 14 July 2021 at Hôpital Cochin in Paris. He was 76, and suffered from an unspecified illness prior to his death.

Following his death, the artist’s moral rights — which prerogatives are the right of disclosure, the right of respect of the works’ integrity and the right to

authorship - were passed on to Angelika Markul.

Gallery

Prizes
1994 Kunstpreis Aachen
1996 Rolandpreis für Kunst im öffentlichen Raum
2007 billionéateurs sans frontières award for visual arts by Cultures France
2006 Praemium Imperiale Award by the Japan Art Association
2001 Goslarer Kaiserring, Goslar, Germany
2001 Kunstpreis, given by Nord/LB, Braunschweig, Germany
2006 Praemium Imperiale award for sculpture, Japan

Works and installations 
 1969 "L'Homme qui tousse"
 1973 "Inventory of Objects Belonging to a Young Man of Oxford"
1988 "Christian Boltanski: Lessons of Darkness"
1989 Monument to the Lycée Chases
 1990 "Reserve of Dead Swiss (Réserve de Suisses morts)"
 2002 "Totentanz II"
 2010 "No Man's Land"
 2010: "People (Personnes)"
 2014 "Animitas"
 2017 "After"
2017 "Mysteries"

References

Further reading 
 Tamar Garb, Didier Semin, Donald Kuspit, "Christian Boltanski", Phaidon, London, 1997.
 Bracha L. Ettinger, Matrix et le Voyage à Jerusalem de C.B. [Conversation/Interview with Christian Boltanski 1989, 60 portrait photographs of C.B next to his works in his studio, by BRACHA, 1990, and notebook fragments 1985-1989]. Artist's book. Paris: BLE Atelier, 1991.
 Lynn Gumpert and Mary Jane Jacob, "Christian Boltanski: Lessons of Darkness," Chicago Museum of Contemporary Art, 1988.
 Didier Semin, "Christian Boltanski," Paris, Art Press, 1988.
 Nancy Marmer, "Christian Boltanski: The Uses of Contradiction," "Art in America," October 1989, pp. 168–181, 233–235.
 Lynn Gumpert, "Christian Boltanski," Paris, Flammarion, 1984.

External links

 Marian Goodman Gallery
 Interview in Tate Magazine
 ICP: Christian Boltanski
 Folkestone Triennial: Christian Boltanski
  Christian Boltanski
 Exhibitions listed at kunstaspekte.de
 MoMA profile
 Art Icono
 Magasin 3: Christian Boltanski
 The Jewish Museum

1944 births
2021 deaths
20th-century French painters
20th-century French sculptors
20th-century French male artists
21st-century French painters
21st-century French male artists
Academic staff of the École des Beaux-Arts
French conceptual artists
French contemporary artists
20th-century French Jews
French male painters
French male sculptors
French mixed-media artists
French people of Corsican descent
French people of Ukrainian-Jewish descent
French photographers
Jewish sculptors
Postmodern artists